Diceratucha xenopis is a moth of the family Oenosandridae and only member of the monotypic genus Diceratucha. It is found in Australia.

External links
Australian moths
Australian Faunal Directory

Oenosandridae
Moths of Australia
Monotypic moth genera
Moths described in 1902